The 1970 Railway Cup Hurling Championship was the 44th series of the hurling Railway Cup. ree matches were played between 8 February and 17 March 1970. It was contested by Connacht, Leinster, Munster and Ulster.

Munster were the winners for the third year in-a-row and for the 32nd occasion overall.

Format

Preliminary round: (1 match) This was a single match between Connacht and Ulster, generally regarded as the two 'weakest' teams in the championship.  One team was eliminated at this stage while the winning team advanced to the semi-final.

Semi-final: (1 match) This was a single match between the winners of the preliminary round and Munster.  One team was eliminated at this stage while the winning team advanced to the final.

Final: (1 match) This winners of the semi-final and Leinster, who received a bye to this stage, contested this game.

Results

Railway Cup

Sources

 Donegan, Des, The Complete Handbook of Gaelic Games (DBA Publications Limited, 2005).

Railway Cup Hurling Championship
Railway Cup Hurling Championship
Hurling